Wildstyle is a style of graffiti.

Wild Style is a 1982 American hip hop culture movie.

Wildstyle or Wild Style may also refer to:

Wildstyle (album), a 2010 EP by American electronic music artist Bassnectar
Wildstyle Pirate Radio, a fictional radio station in Grand Theft Auto: Vice City recorded by Trouble Funk
"Wildstyle", a 1983 hip-hop single by Afrika Bambaataa
Wildstyle, rapper/member of Chicago hip-hop group Crucial Conflict
Wyldstyle, a character from The Lego Movie whose real name is Lucy